"Paper Sun" is a song by British rock band Traffic, and was released as their debut single in May 1967. It was a number 5 hit in the United Kingdom, number 4 in Canada, and peaked at number 70 on the Cash Box Top 100 chart in the United States. The song is famous for its time-typical sitar riff, played by Dave Mason, and its vocals by composer Steve Winwood. It was also released in an edited version on the U.S. version of the band's debut album, Mr. Fantasy (briefly titled Heaven Is in Your Mind).

The black-and-white music video was shot at the Royal Museum for Central Africa (AfricaMuseum) in Tervuren, Belgium.

The single's B-side, "Giving to You", features an opening vocal section with lyrics sung by Winwood. The original B-side version was later released as a bonus track on a CD reissue of Mr. Fantasy. The song was later issued in a modified version (4:20) on Mr. Fantasy. The album version begins and ends with overdubbed spoken parts (probably by Chris Wood).

The song appeared on the soundtrack of the 2010 British film Made in Dagenham.

References

External links
.
 Entry at discogs.com

Traffic (band) songs
1967 debut singles
Songs written by Steve Winwood
Songs written by Jim Capaldi
Song recordings produced by Jimmy Miller
Island Records singles
1967 songs